Macabre is the second studio album by Japanese heavy metal band Dir En Grey. It was released on September 20, 2000. It was the band's first record to be released in collaboration of Free-Will's Firewall sub-division and Sony Music Entertainment Japan. The original print of Macabre featured an etched, tinted jewel case with five wooden beads placed within the spine. The album proper, like Gauze, included two booklets: one with the lyrics, and the other featuring a related image and poem.

Track listing

Notes 
 The album features Russian imagery; the artwork contains Cyrillic; the lyrics for "Deity" are written in Russian; and the song title "Rasetsukoku" was the Chinese name for Russia during the Qing Dynasty.
 "Deity" is similar to the Russian word for children, "deti" ("дети"). The accompanying image in the lyric booklet is of a pregnant woman's stomach. A portion of the melody in "Deity" appears to be derived from Johannes Brahms' Hungarian Dance No. 5.
 "理由" is normally romanized as "riyū", yet is romanized by the band as "wake"; both "wake" ("訳") and "riyū" ("理由") can be translated as "reason".
 "egnirys cimredopyh" is hypodermic syringe spelled backwards; it was written in this manner due to the censorship board in Japan.
 When read left to right, Macabres subtitle "揚羽ノ羽ノ夢ハ蛹" transliterates as "Ageha no hane no yume wa sanagi", or "The Swallowtail's Wings' Dream is the Chrysalis". However, the title contains numbered furigana above it, which suggests that the title is to be read as "Sanagi no yume wa ageha no hane", or "The Chrysalis' Dream is the Swallowtail's Wings".
 "Taiyō no Ao" uses a kanji that is commonly read as "midori" and means for "green", whereas the band uses a reading that means "blue".
 A rearrangement of the track "Hydra" appears on their 2007 single "Dozing Green" as a B-side, retitled to "Hydra -666-".
 A re-recording of the track "Rasetsukoku" appears as a bonus track on their 2011 album Dum Spiro Spero.
 A re-recording of the track "Macabre -Sanagi no Yume wa Ageha no Hane-" (simply titled "MACABRE") appears on the second disc of the Limited Edition of their 2013 mini-album The Unraveling.
 A re-recording of the track "Wake" appears on the second disc of the Limited Editions of their 2018 album The Insulated World.

Chart positions

Personnel 

Dir En Grey – producer
Kyo – vocals, lyricist
Kaoru – guitar
Die – guitar
Toshiya – bass guitar
Shinya – drums

Hoppy Kamiyama – producer
Chieko Kinbara – violin (Hotarubi)
Hiroshi "Dynamite Tommy" Tomioka – executive producer
Koji Yoda – art director
Hidemi Ogata – cover art

References 

2000 albums
Dir En Grey albums
Free-Will albums